It's Not the End of the World may refer to:
It's Not the End of the World a novel by Judy Blume
"It's Not the End of the World, But I Can See It from Here", a song by Lostprophets from their 2010 album The Betrayed
"It's Not the End of the World?", a song by Super Furry Animals from their 2001 album Rings Around the World